Dansar may refer to:
 Dansar, Nik Shahar
 Dansar, Qasr-e Qand
 Dansar, Sarbuk, Qasr-e Qand County
 Dansar Kaldan, Qasr-e Qand County